This is a list of civil wars or other organized internal civil unrests fought during the history of the Sasanian Empire (224–651). The definition of organized civil unrest is any conflict that was fought within the borders of the Sasanian Empire, with at least one opposition leader against the ruling government.

3rd century
 281-283: Revolt of Hormizd of Sakastan.
 293: Revolt of Narseh.

5th century
 May 26, 451: Christian Armenian revolt.
 459-463: Rebellion of Vache II.
 485: Rebellion of Zarir.

6th century
 530 or 537: Rebellion of Kawus.
 550: Revolt of Anoshazad.
 589-591: Sasanian civil war.
 591–596 or 594/5–600: Rebellion of Vistahm.

7th century
 595-602: Rebellion of Vistahm.
 February 23–25, 628: Revolt of Kavadh II.
 628-632: Sasanian civil war.
 27 April 629: Revolt and usurpation of Shahrbaraz.
 17 June 629: Overthrow of Shahrbaraz by Borandukht.
 630: Attempted usurpation of Khosrau III.
 630: Usurpation by Shapur-i Shahrvaraz.
 630: Attempted usurpation of Peroz II.
 630: Overthrow of Shapur-i Shahrvaraz by Farrukh Hormizd, successful seizure of the throne by Azarmidokht.
 630: Attempted usurpation of Farrukh Hormizd.
 630: Attempted usurpation of Hormizd VI.
 631: Attempted usurpation of Khosrau IV.
 631: Successful coup by Rostam Farrokhzad; Azarmidokht is killed, and Borandukht is restored to throne.
 632: Revolt of Piruz Khosrow; Borandukht is killed, and Yazdegerd III becomes the new king of Ērānshahr.

See also
 Muslim conquest of Persia
 Roman-Persian Wars

Sources

 
 
 
 
 

 
Revolts and civil wars